Kozłów  is a village in Miechów County, Lesser Poland Voivodeship, in southern Poland. It is the seat of the gmina (administrative district) called Gmina Kozłów.

The village has a population of 1,100.

External links
 Jewish Community in Kozłów on Virtual Shtetl

References

Villages in Miechów County
Kielce Governorate
Kielce Voivodeship (1919–1939)